Lady from Chungking is a 1942 American war film.

Plot
In World War II, Chinese guerrillas fight against the occupying Japanese forces.  A young woman is the secret leader of the villagers, who plot to rescue two downed Flying Tigers pilots who are currently in the custody of the Japanese.  The rescue mission takes on even more importance with the arrival of a Japanese general, which signals a major offensive taking place in the area.

Cast
 Anna May Wong – Kwan Mei
 Harold Huber – General Kaimura
 Mae Clarke – Lavara
 Rick Vallin – Rodney Carr
 Paul Bryar – Pat O'Roulke
 Ted Hecht – Lieutenant Shimoto
 Ludwig Donath – Hans Gruber
 James B. Leong – Chen
 Archie Got – Mochow
 Walter Soo Hoo – Lu-Chi

Home media
Alpha Video released the film on region-1 DVD on May 31, 2005.

It is available to stream on Paramount+.

Notes

External links 
 
 
 

1942 films
American black-and-white films
American World War II propaganda films
1940s English-language films
Films directed by William Nigh
Flying Tigers in fiction
Producers Releasing Corporation films
Second Sino-Japanese War films
1940s war films